Raison D'être is the ninth studio album by jazz guitarist Frank Gambale, released on 13 April 2004 by Wombat Records.

Track listing

Personnel
Credits adapted from CD edition liner notes:
Frank Gambale – guitar, arrangement, mixing, production, executive production
Billy Cobham – drums, percussion
Ric Fierabracci – bass
Steve Billman – bass
Robert M. Biles – engineering, mixing
Dave Frederic – engineering
Joe Gastwirt – mastering

References

External links
In Review: Frank Gambale "Raison D'etre" at Guitar Nine Records

Frank Gambale albums
2004 albums